Fengtai Subdistrict is a subdistrict of Fengtai District, Beijing, China. It borders Lugouqiao Township to the northeast, Xincun Subdistrict to the soueast, Huaxiang Township to the southwest, and Lugouqiao Subdistrict to the northwest. As of the 2020 Chinese National Census, the entire area of Fengtai subdistrict had a population of 137,290.

The name Fengtai was inherited from the subdistrict's predecessor Fengtai Town.

History

Administrative Division 

In 2021, Fengtai Subdistrict comprises 18 subdivisions, 17 of which are communities:

See also 
 List of township-level divisions of Beijing

References 

Fengtai District
Subdistricts of Beijing